Mitsui is the name of a large Japanese conglomerate, Mitsui Group.

Mitsui may also refer to:

Companies
Mitsui & Co., a Japanese general trading company, part of the Mitsui Group
Mitsui O.S.K. Lines, a shipping company
Mitsui Chemicals
Mitsui Fudosan, property firm
Mitsui Rail Capital (MRCE), a railway leasing company
Mitsui Oil Exploration Co.
Mitsui Engineering & Shipbuilding
Kinkisharyo-Mitsui, public transit vehicle manufacturer
Mitsui Babcock, engineering (boilers) company, now part of Doosan Babcock

Other uses
Mitsui (surname)
Mitsui family, article about the family of industrialist and merchants
Mitsui Golden Glove Award
Mitsui Hisashi, character in the "Slam Dunk" anime manga series
Mitsui Memorial Museum
Mitsui 56-series, a large series of ships built by Mitsui Engineering & Shipbuilding